Henry Gordon is a given name.

Notable people bearing this name include:
Henry Gordon Bennett
Henry Gordon McMorran
Henry Gordon Rice
Henry Gordon Wells
Henry Gordon-Lennox
Harry Gordon Frankfurt
Harry Gordon Johnson
Harry Gordon Selfridge